Michel Steininger (born 5 February 1935) is a Swiss fencer. He competed at the 1960, 1964 and 1968 Summer Olympics.

References

1935 births
Living people
Swiss male fencers
Olympic fencers of Switzerland
Fencers at the 1960 Summer Olympics
Fencers at the 1964 Summer Olympics
Fencers at the 1968 Summer Olympics
Sportspeople from Lausanne
Universiade medalists in fencing
Universiade silver medalists for Switzerland
Medalists at the 1959 Summer Universiade
Medalists at the 1963 Summer Universiade